Verethragna or Bahram is an Indo-Iranian deity.

The neuter noun verethragna is related to Avestan verethra, 'obstacle' and verethragnan, 'victorious'. Representing this concept is the divinity Verethragna, who is the hypostasis of "victory", and "as a giver of victory Verethragna plainly enjoyed the greatest popularity of old." In Zoroastrian Middle Persian, Verethragna became 𐭥𐭫𐭧𐭫𐭠𐭭 Warahrām, from which Vahram, Vehram, Bahram, Behram and other variants derive.

The word has a cognate in Vedic Sanskrit. The Vedic god Indra may correspond to the Verethragna  of the Zoroastrian Avesta; In Vedic Sanskrit vr̥tragʰná- is predominantly an epithet of Indra, which corresponds to the noun verethragna- of Avestan.

The name and, to some extent, the deity was borrowed into Armenian Վահագն Vahagn and Վռամ Vṙam, and has cognates in Buddhist Sogdian 𐫇𐫢𐫄𐫗 wšɣn w(i)šaɣn, Manichaen Parthian 𐭅𐭓𐭉𐭇𐭓𐭌 wryḥrm Wahrām, Kushan Bactrian  ορλαγνο Orlagno. While the figure of Verethragna is highly complex, parallels have also been drawn between, Puranic Vishnu, Manichaean Adamas, Chaldean/Babylonian Nergal, Egyptian Horus, Hellenic Ares and Heracles.

In scripture

In the Bahram Yasht
Yasht 14, the hymn of praise to Verethragna, "though ill-preserved, contains what seem very archaic elements". There, Verethragna is described as "the most highly armed" (Yasht 14.1), the "best equipped with might" (14.13), with "effervescent glory" (14.3), has "conquering superiority" (14.64), and is in constant battle with men and daemons (14.4, 14.62).

Verethragna is not exclusively associated with military might and victory. So, for instance, he is connected with sexual potency and "confers virility" (Yasht 14.29), has the "ability to heal" (14.3) and "renders wonderful". The Yasht begins with an enumeration of the ten forms in which the divinity appears: As an impetuous wind (14.2-5); as an armed warrior (14.27) and as an adolescent of fifteen (14.17); and in the remaining seven forms as animals: a bull with horns of gold (14.7); a white horse with ears and a muzzle of gold (14.9); a camel in heat (14.11-13); a boar (14.15); a bird of prey (veregna, 14.19-21); a ram (14.23); and a wild goat (14.25). Many of these incarnations are also shared with other divinities, for instance, the youth, the bull and the horse are also attributed to Tishtrya. Likewise, the bird, the camel and the wind to Vayu-Vata, another member of the Zoroastrian pantheon associated with martial victory.

In other texts
Together with Čistā, Verethragna is a principal companion of Mithra (Mihr Yasht 10.70). Several sections of the Bahram Yasht also appear in hymns dedicated to other divinities, but it is rarely possible to determine in which direction those sections were copied.

The identification of Verethragna as a boar in Yasht 14 led Ilya Gershevitch to identify Dāmōiš Upamana – a boar in the Avestan hymn to Mithra – to be an alter-ego of Verethragna.

In culture and tradition

In the Zoroastrian hierarchy
In the Zoroastrian hierarchy of divinities, Bahram is a helper of Asha Vahishta (Avestan, middle Persian: Ardvahisht), the Amesha Spenta responsible for the luminaries. In the Zoroastrian calendar instituted during the late Achaemenid era (648–330 BCE), the twentieth day of the month is dedicated to Bahram (Siroza 1.20).

In the later middle Persian texts Bahram is especially venerated as one of the Amesha Spentas, effectively giving him the high rank for his success in driving back Angra Mainyu

As the name of a planet

In the astronomical and calendrical reforms of the Sasanian (224-651 CE), the planet Mars was named Bahram. Zaehner attributes this to the syncretic influences of the Chaldean astral-theological system, where Babylonian  Nergal is both the god of war and the name of the red planet. (see also: "Fatalistic" Zurvanism).

In the name of a class of fire
According to Boyce, the present-day expression Atash-Behram as the name of the most sacred class of fires is a confusion of the adjectival "Victorious Fire" with "Fire of Bahram" The former is the way it appears in Middle Persian inscriptions such as the Kartir inscription at Kabah-i Zardusht, while the latter is what is now understood by the term Atash-Behram. Gnoli attributes the change to natural misunderstanding "abetted in Islamic times by a progressive decay in Zoroastrian priestly teaching"

In art and iconography

The only evidence of a cult appears in the first century account of Strabo, who reports, probably on authority of Nearchus, that the Carmanians worshipped a divinity of victory (Geographika, 15.2.14). That this was Bahramb / Verethragna is unlikely if, as per Strabo, he was their "only god." However, the account does reveal that divinities of war were known to the people who were not of the Iranian plateau, evidence for which also comes from Herodotus (4.59.62).

Under the Seleucids (330–150 BCE) and Arsacids (250 BCE–226 CE), that is, in the Empires influenced by Hellenic culture, Verethragna was both identified as Ares and associated with Heracles, and given the Greek name Artagnes. This syncretism is well attested in statuary and iconography, most notably in that of the inscription of Antiochus I Theos of Commagene, in which all three names occur together.

That Bahram was considered the patron divinity of travelers is perhaps reflected by the life-size rock sculpture of the divinity on the main highway at Behistun. There Bahram reclines with a goblet in his hand, a club at his feet, and a lion-skin beneath him.

In the early Sasanian period Bahram is still represented as the Greek Heracles. In the relief of Ardeshir I at Naqs-e Rajab III, Bahram appears as one of the two smaller figures between Ahura Mazda and the king. There, he has a lion's skin in his left hand and brandishes a club in his right. The other small figure – who appears to be paying homage to Bahram – is the future king Bahram I.

Bahram also appears as wings, or as a bird of prey, in the crowns of the Sasanian kings. This iconography first appears in the crown of Bahram II which also bears the name of the divinity. A similar image is adopted by Peroz (whose name also means 'victorious') as well as by Khosrau Parwez (again, Parwez meaning 'ever-victorious'). Similarly, boar and eagle heads on caps crown the heads of princes. Boar figures are widespread in Sasanian art, appearing in everything from textiles to stucco and in silver ornaments, coins, and seals. Other animal motifs have been found that recall the aspects of Bahram (see the ten forms of Bahram in the Avesta, above). The bird motif on Sasanian-era fire altars are also believed to represent Bahram.

As the name of kings
Bahram was the name of six Sasanian kings:
 Bahram I, r. 271–274. Son and successor of Shapur I
 Bahram II, r. 274–293. Son and successor of Bahram I
 Bahram III, r. 293. Son and successor of Bahram II
 Bahram IV, r. 388–399. Son and successor of Shapur III
 Bahram V, r. 420–438. Son and successor of Yazdegerd I
 Bahram Chobin, r. 590 - 591. Successor of Hormizd IV

In Avestan scholarship

The interpretation of the divinity was once one of the more widely debated fields in Zoroastrian scholarship since the theories of origin reflected a radical revolution in ethical, moral and religious values.

Primarily because the Avestan adjective verethragnan ('victorious') had a corresponding Vedic term vrtrahan where it appeared "preponderantly [as] a qualification of Indra", Zoroastrians and Hindus accept that  in Indo-Iranian times there existed the warrior god Indra and that Avestan Verethragna might be analogous to that divine figure. The Sanskrit cognate of Verethragna is Vritraghna, which is an epithet for Indra in Vedic literature, and he too is the destroyer of "Vritra", an Asura whose name literally means obstacle.

But western scholars oppose this identification. In the Avesta, it is the hero warrior-priest Fereydun who battles the serpent Aži Dahāka (which, for the virtue of 'Azi' being cognate with Sanskrit 'Ahi', snake, is – by proponents of the theory - associated with Vedic Vritra). One Western scholar claims that, in the Vedas, the epithet 'hero' (sura) is itself almost exclusively reserved for Indra, while in the Avesta it is applied to Thraetaona and other non-divine figures. The term "victorious" is not restricted to Verethragna, but is also a property of a number of other figures, both divine and mortal, including Thraetaona. Then, while in the Vedas it is Indra who discovers Soma, in the Avesta, it is humans who first press Haoma and Thraetaona is attributed with being the "inventor of medicine". In the Vedas, Indra strikes with vajra, but in the Avesta vazra is Mithra's weapon.

Attempts to resolve these objections led to the development of another theory, in which, in addition to the pre-historical divinity of victory, there was also a dragon-slaying hero Indra. Then, while the Iranians retained the figures independently of one another, the Indians conflated the two (leaving an echo in the character of Trita Aptya).

This theory too had its problems, in particular the fact that Indra was already evidently a divine figure, and not a man, in the Mittani treaties, where he appears in the company of Mitra and Varuna. That again raises more questions since the treaties echo the Rig Veda's invocation of all three as protectors of contract, again, not a property associated with Verethragna.

However, as Benveniste and Renou demonstrated, many of the objections to the first theory could be negated if the evidence were reviewed in light of the fact that the principal feature of Verethragna was not to slay noxious creatures but to overcome obstacles (verethra), in particular to unblock the flow of apas, the waters, the holiest of the elements.

Paul Thieme agreed with this principal feature, but clarified that while the wealth of archaic elements in the Bahram Yasht clearly point to the pre-Zoroastrian era, the interpretation of proper names is "highly conjectural", and "in no case do we get a decisive argument against their Indo-Aryan or old Indic character"  Adopting "the exact linguistic and exegetic analysis" of Benveniste and Renou, Thieme concludes "Proto-Aryan *Indra has assumed the functions of a Proto-Aryan god *Vrtraghna." Noting that Vrtrahan is the name of Indra only in the later Sanskrit texts (but not in the Rig Veda), Thieme adds "there is no valid justification for supposing that the Proto-Aryan adjective *vrtraghan was specifically connected with *Indra or any other particular god."

See also
Indra
Vritra

References

Bibliography 

  
  
 
  
 
 
 

 
 
 
 

Yazatas
Ancient Iranian gods
Martian deities